The discography of The Living End, an Australian punk rock and psychobilly group, consists of eight studio albums, twenty-three singles, six extended plays (EPs), four video albums and three compilation albums. Chris Cheney, Scott Owen and Joe Piripitzi formed The Living End in 1994; their debut release was Hellbound, an eight-track EP, in 1995. The group's first single, "From Here on In", was issued in 1996 from their second EP, It's for Your Own Good, which received airplay on Triple J, an Australian radio station. Soon after, Piripitzi was replaced on drums by Travis Demsey. The band's breakthrough hit occurred in 1997 with "Second Solution / Prisoner of Society", a double A-sided single/EP, which became the highest-selling Australian-made single of the 1990s. It peaked at number four and spent 47 weeks in the ARIA Top 50 Singles chart, and charted in the top 30 of the United States' Hot Modern Rock Tracks chart.

In 1998, The Living End signed with Modular Recordings and released their debut album, The Living End. It peaked at number one on the Australian Albums Chart and was certified four times-platinum by the Australian Recording Industry Association (ARIA) – indicating shipment of 280,000 copies in Australia. Six tracks from the debut album were issued as singles and, as of September 2015, it remains The Living End's most commercially successful album. Their second album, Roll On (2000), provided the singles, "Pictures in the Mirror" and "Roll On". It peaked at number eight and received a platinum certification. Andy Strachan replaced Dempsey on drums in 2002. Modern Artillery was the band's third album, released in 2003, which peaked at number three. It achieved gold status in Australia, making it their lowest-selling album to date.

The band returned to the number-one position on the Australian Albums Chart in 2006 with their fourth album, State of Emergency. It included two more top 10 singles, "Wake Up" and "What's on Your Radio?", which charted at number five and nine respectively. In 2008 they released a fifth studio album, White Noise, along with a double A-side single, "White Noise / How Do We Know?". The album debuted at number two on the Australian Albums Chart and achieved a gold accreditation. The title track reached number twelve in its third week and was eventually certified platinum. White Noise is the group's highest-charting album on the Official New Zealand Music Chart, where it reached number 18. The group's sixth studio album, The Ending Is Just the Beginning Repeating (2011), reached number three in Australia and was also certified gold there.

Albums

Studio albums

Compilation albums

Extended plays

Singles

Notes

D released as a double A-side, featuring both "White Noise" and "How Do We Know?"

Other appearances

Videos

Video albums

Music videos

Notes

References

General

Specific

External links

TheLivingEnd.com Official Website

The Living End at MusicBrainz

Living End, The
Discographies of Australian artists